Ted Wells (1899–1948) was an American actor and stuntman active mainly in westerns.

Selected filmography
 Fangs of Fate (1925)
 Desert Dust (1927)
 Straight Shootin' (1927)
 Across the Plains (1928)
 Thunder Riders (1928)
 Beauty and Bullets (1928)
 Grit Wins (1928)
 Cheyenne Trails (1928)
 Greased Lightning (1928)
 The Crimson Canyon (1928)
 The Smiling Terror (1929)
 Born to the Saddle (1929)
 The Phantom Cowboy (1935)
 West of Carson City (1940)
 Tucson Raiders (1944)

References

Bibliography
 Michael R. Pitts. Poverty Row Studios, 1929–1940: An Illustrated History of 55 Independent Film Companies, with a Filmography for Each. McFarland & Company, 2005.

External links

1899 births
1948 deaths
American male film actors
People from Midland, Texas